Arqamani (also Arkamani or Ergamenes II) was a Kushite King of Meroë dating from the late 3rd to early 2nd century BCE.

Biography
It is believed that Arqamani ruled in Meroë at the time of the Egyptian revolt of Horwennefer against Ptolemy IV Philopator (reign 221–204 BC). He is attested by a number of inscriptions and reliefs from Kalabsha, Philae and the temple of Dakka. In the latter locality, he usurped some donation inscriptions originally inscribed for Ptolemy IV. He was buried in a pyramid in Meroë now known as Beg. N 7.

Arqamani took an elaborate ancient Egyptian royal titulary (see infobox) which likely reflects his control above the reconquered Lower Nubia and its inhabitants. He also took mortuary names: the mortuary Horus name is Kashy-netjery-kheper, meaning "The Kushite whose coming into being is divine", while his nomen is accompanied by the epithet Ankhdjet-meriaset, meaning "Given life, beloved of Isis", as well as Mkltk Istrk which is written in Meroitic script and whose meaning is not known.
He was sometimes tentatively identified with the king Ergamenes mentioned by Diodorus Siculus but modern scholars now believe that an earlier king with a similar name, Arakamani, is a better candidate for this identification. Nevertheless, Arqamani is often called Ergamenes II.

See also
 List of monarchs of Kush

References

Further reading and Bibliography

, pp. 660-662

3rd-century BC monarchs of Kush
2nd-century BC monarchs of Kush
3rd-century BC rulers
2nd-century BC rulers